Phisalixella is a genus of pseudoxyrhophiid snakes endemic to the island of Madagascar. They are harmless to humans.

Species
Three species are currently recognized.

Phisalixella arctifasciatus (Duméril, Bibron, & Duméril, 1854)
Phisalixella tulearensis (Domergue, 1995)
Phisalixella variabilis  (Boulenger, 1896)

References

Further reading
 

Pseudoxyrhophiidae
Reptiles of Madagascar
Snake genera